Drayton Hall is an 18th-century plantation located on the Ashley River about 15 miles (24 km) northwest of Charleston, South Carolina, and directly across the Ashley River from North Charleston, west of the Ashley in the Lowcountry. An example of Palladian architecture in North America and the only plantation house on the Ashley River to survive intact through both the Revolutionary and Civil wars, it is a National Historic Landmark.

Description 
The house has a double projecting portico on the west facade, which faces away from the river and toward the land side approach from Ashley River Road. The portico resembles a similar feature at the  Villa Cornaro near Venice, Italy, designed by Renaissance architect Andrea Palladio in 1551. The floor plan of Drayton Hall is Palladian-inspired as well, perhaps derived from Plate 38 of James Gibbs' A Book of Architecture, the influential pattern-book published in London in 1728. A large central entrance stair hall with a symmetrical divided staircase is backed by a large salon, flanked by square and rectangular chambers. Pedimented chimney-pieces in the house echo designs of Inigo Jones.

History 
The mansion was built for the grandfather of John Drayton, John Drayton Sr. (–1779; son of Thomas and Ann Drayton) after he bought the property in 1738. As the third son in his family, he knew he was unlikely to inherit his own nearby birthplace, now called Magnolia Plantation and Gardens.

For many decades, the house was thought to have been begun in 1738 and completed in 1752. In 2014, an examination of wood cores showed that the attic timbers were cut from trees felled in the winter of 1747–48. Because the attic framing would have to have been in place well before the completion of the interior finishes, the house is now thought to have been occupied by the early 1750s. The seven-bay, double-pile plantation house is within a  site that is part of the plantation based on indigo and rice and the former site of 13 slave cabins believed to have housed approximately 78 slaves. Seven generations of Drayton heirs preserved the house, though the flanking outbuildings have not survived: an earthquake destroyed the laundry house in 1886, and a hurricane destroyed the kitchen in 1893. John Drayton bought considerable property nearby from his nephew William Drayton, Sr., after the latter was appointed as chief justice of the Province of East Florida in the early 1770s and was leaving South Carolina.  John Drayton consolidated the various Drayton properties, and his descendants have controlled them since.

The house is located in the Ashley River Historic District, it was declared a National Historic Landmark in 1960. Drayton Hall is owned by the National Trust for Historic Preservation and managed by the Drayton Hall Preservation Trust, which opened the house to the public in 1976.

Gallery

See also
 List of the oldest buildings in South Carolina
 List of National Historic Landmarks in South Carolina
 National Register of Historic Places listings in Charleston, South Carolina

References

External links

Drayton Hall homepage
The Center for Palladian Studies in America, Inc.
Drayton Hall, Charleston County (S.C. Hwy. 61, Charleston vicinity) (with 37 photographs), at South Carolina Department of Archives and History
Great Buildings on-line: Drayton Hall

South Carolina Plantations: Drayton Hall

Slave cabins and quarters in the United States
Houses completed in 1752
1752 establishments in South Carolina
South Carolina in the American Civil War
National Historic Landmarks in South Carolina
Drayton family
Historic house museums in South Carolina
Plantation houses in South Carolina
Palladian Revival architecture in the United States
Neoclassical architecture in South Carolina
National Register of Historic Places in Charleston, South Carolina
Museums in Charleston, South Carolina
Historic American Buildings Survey in South Carolina
National Trust for Historic Preservation
Individually listed contributing properties to historic districts on the National Register in South Carolina
Houses on the National Register of Historic Places in South Carolina